The Climate Clock is a graphic to demonstrate how quickly the planet is approaching 1.5 °C of global warming, given current emissions trends. It also shows the amount of CO2 already emitted, and the global warming to date.

The Climate Clock was launched in 2015 to provide a measuring stick against which viewers can track climate change mitigation progress. The date shown when humanity reaches 1.5°C will move closer as emissions rise, and further away as emissions decrease. An alternative view projects the time remaining to 2.0°C of warming. The clock is updated every year to reflect the latest global CO2 emissions trend and rate of climate warming. As of June 2022, the clock counts down towards late July 2029. On September 20, 2021, the clock was delayed to July 28, 2028, likely because of the COP26 Conference and the land protection by indigenous peoples.

The clock is hosted by Human Impact Lab, itself part of Concordia University. Organisations supporting the climate clock include Concordia University, the David Suzuki Foundation, Future Earth, and the Climate Reality Project.

Relevance
1.5 °C is an important threshold for many climate impacts, as shown by the Special Report on Global Warming of 1.5 °C. Every increment to global temperature is expected to increase weather extremes, such as heat waves and extreme precipitation events. There is also the risk of irreversible ice sheet loss. Consequent sea level rise also increases sharply between 1.5 °C and 2 °C, and virtually all corals could be wiped out at 2 °C warming.

The New York Climate Clock 
In late September 2020, artists and activists, Gan Golan, Katie Peyton Hofstadter, Adrian Carpenter and Andrew Boyd repurposed the Metronome in Union Square in New York City to show the Climate Clock. The goal was to "remind the world every day just how perilously close we are to the brink." This is in juxtaposition to the Doomsday Clock, which measures a variety of factors that could lead to "destroying the world" using "dangerous technologies of our making," with climate change being one of the smaller factors. This specific installation is expected to be one of many in cities around the world. At the time of installation, the clock read 7 years and 102 days. Greta Thunberg, Swedish environmental activist, was involved in the project early on, and reportedly received a hand-held version of the climate clock.

Since its inception, the New York Climate Clock has added a second set of numbers for the percentage of the world's energy use that comes from renewable energy sources.

See also
 Climate Action Tracker
 Paris Agreement: limits global warming to 2 °C, pursues 1,5 °C
 Effects of global warming which further increase CO2 emissions: forest fires, arctic methane release, ...

References

External links
 Climate Clock website
 Another climate clock
 Climate Action Tracker: continuously tracks emissions of individual countries

Alert measurement systems
Clocks
Political symbols